Captain George Edwin Thomson DSO MC (19 September 1897 – 23 May 1918) was a Scottish World War I flying ace credited with 21 aerial victories. He was the second ranking ace of his squadron, and one of the leading Sopwith Camel aces.

Early life and service
George Edwin Thomson was the son of James and Ellen Thomson, who were native to Glenfuccan, Helensburgh, Dumbartonshire, Scotland. He was born in Rangoon (now Yangon), Burma (now Myanmar) on 19 September 1897.

Thomson went to the United Kingdom in order to join the King's Own Scottish Borderers. He transferred to the Royal Flying Corps in September 1916. His appointment as a Flying Officer with the rank of temporary second lieutenant was dated 30 December 1916.

Flying service
Thomson was seriously injured during flight training; the accident left him with lasting scars to his face. Nevertheless, he joined 46 Squadron during the summer of 1917, to fly a Sopwith Pup. On 25 September 1917, he scored his first victory flying Pup no. B2196, destroying an enemy reconnaissance plane.

Then 46 Squadron re-equipped with Sopwith Camels. On 30 November 1917, Thomson used Camel no. B3514 to destroy an Albatros D.V and capture a Pfalz D.III. On 10 December, he drove down another D.V out of control, using Camel no. B2451.

He would not score again until 18 January 1918, when he drove another two-seater down out of control, still using B2451. In February, he would use Camel B9131 to drive down an Albatros two-seater.

Then came March. He used four different Camels and reeled off fifteen victories within the month, including four on the 16th, three on the 23rd, and two on the 17th. The three on the 23rd brought his total to 21. His tally included five enemy planes destroyed; he shared one of these triumphs with fellow ace Sydney Smith. He also drove down fifteen enemy planes out of control; one of these victories was also shared with Smith, and another with Horace Debenham.  The remaining win was the captured Pfalz.

Thomson was awarded the Military Cross on 22 April 1918. The Distinguished Service Order followed on 22 June. He also received the Distinguished Flying Cross, gazetted 21 September 1918.

Death
He was then transferred to the Home Establishment in England as an instructor. On 23 May 1918, he took off from No. 7 Training Depot at Port Meadow, Oxford. His plane burst into flames and he died in the fiery crash. He was buried at Wolvercote Cemetery, Oxford.

Honours and awards
Military Cross (MC)

 
Distinguished Service Order (DSO)

Captain Thomson also won the Distinguished Flying Cross, gazetted 21 September 1918.

Notes

References
 

1897 births
1918 deaths
British World War I flying aces
Scottish flying aces
Companions of the Distinguished Service Order
Recipients of the Military Cross
Royal Flying Corps officers
Aviators killed in aviation accidents or incidents in England
Scottish airmen
British military personnel killed in World War I